Charlie Sims may refer to:

Charlie Sims (The Only Way Is Essex)
Charlie Sims, character in Center Stage (2000 film)